The 2017–18 season was the 94th season in the existence of AEK Athens F.C. and the 57th competitive season and third consecutive in the top flight of Greek football. They competed in the Super League, the Greek Cup, the Champions League and the UEFA Europa League. The season began on 25 July 2017 and finished on 12 May 2018.

Events
June 7, 2017 Ilias Vouras and Christos Aravidis leave the club as their contracts are not renewed.
June 9, 2017 AEK players Anastasios Bakasetas, Petros Mantalos and Ognjen Vranješ face each other at an international national team match for 2018 World Cup qualifying round, between Bosnia and Herzegovina and Greece, at Bilino Polje Stadium, Zenica. Mantalos and Vranješ played all 90 minutes, Mantalos missing a great chance for Greece at 82nd minute, when shot the ball out at a one-on-one against Asmir Begović. The match ended 0–0, satisfying Greece, who needed at least the draw to stay at the top two places.
June 10, 2017 In Nea Philadelphia the presentation of the book from journalist Nikos Angelidis called "Every AEK of the world" took place. The book had as a subject the 302 clubs of the world that are named or were named after AEK and have the two-headed eagle as an emblem. AEK FC president, Evangelos Aslanidis went to the presentation and made a speech. AEK FC is a sponsor of the book.
June 14, 2017 The minister of infrastructure, transport and networks, Christos Spirtzis, signs the necessary height-related study for Agia Sophia Stadium, the proposed stadium for AEK in Nea Philadelphia. As the club's official announcement states, the particular study was "the last obstacle" for the start of the construction of the stadium and the official construction license for the stadium is about to be published "within the next days".
June 21, 2017 Portuguese left-back Hélder Lopes signs a two-year deal with AEK Athens, in a free transfer from Las Palmas.
June 27, 2017 Ronald Vargas and Dimitrios Kolovetsios leave the club as no deal for their announcement was made.
 June 29, 2017 Greek-Belgian winger Viktor Klonaridis signs a three-year deal with AEK Athens from RC Lens. On the same day, Super League newcomers Lamia announced a loan transfer of Stavros Vasilantonopoulos from AEK.
July 1, 2017 Croatian striker Marko Livaja signs from Las Palmas on a season long loan deal for €200,000 with a purchase option of €1,800,000 in the summer of 2018. Livaja became the third player which was transferred from Las Palmas to AEK within 2017, after Sergio Araujo and Hélder Lopes. Marko, as presented in the official club video, will wear the shirt with number 10.
July 3, 2017 Serbian centre-back Uroš Ćosić signs with AEK for three years, with an extension clause of one more year, in a full transfer from Empoli F.C. Uroš, as observed in the official video of his signing, will wear the shirt with number 15.
July 5, 2017 Icelander left winger Arnór Traustason signs with AEK on loan for one year from Rapid Wien, with a permanent buyout clause at the summer of 2018. Arnór, as presented in the official video, will wear the shirt with number 30. This transfer would be the seventh summer transfer for AEK Athens of summer 2017. On the same day, newly promoted to Super League club Lamia officially announced that, after Stavros Vasilantonopoulos, another player will be loaned from AEK to Lamia, midfielder Ilias Tselios.
July 12, 2017 The talk of the administrative leader of AEK Athens, Dimitris Melissanidis, during the AEK Sports Club General Assembly, was featured in an official AEK F.C. TV video. Melissanidis mentioned all the "hindrances" during the "extremely painful road" until the license which would enable the, then proposed, Agia Sophia Stadium broke ground. The official announcement states that procedures are ending and that the stadium will soon break ground and that the members whose actions toughened the procedures for the stadium were unanimously deleted from the club.
July 14, 2017 The UEFA Champions League draw brought Russian club CSKA Moscow as opponents of AEK for the third qualifying round.
July 24, 2017 It is officially announced from the official AEK website, that the club has received the official construction license, so that the Agia Sophia Stadium breaks ground, simultaneously inviting the team fans to celebrate the license in the upcoming match against CSKA Moscow for the Champions League third qualifying round.
July 25, 2017 As mentioned the day before, AEK obtained the official construction license, announcing it officially on the football club page, with the title "It's not a dream! IT'S A FACT!", inviting the fans of AEK to the sanctification on upcoming Thursday, where the new stadium will break ground at Nea Filadelfeia. On the same day, the construction license was featured on the giant screen of the Olympic Stadium, where AEK faced CSKA Moscow for the Champions League.
July 27, 2017 The sanctification for the beginning of the construction of Agia Sophia Stadium took place, with more than 15,000 fans of AEK being present, in Nea Filadelfeia, with the club officially thanking them for their presence. Among others, he club's administrative leader Dimitris Melissanidis, former club player Stelios Serafidis made a speech about the new stadium. Dimitris Melissanidis, in his speech, mentioned, among others, that "the walls of Agia Sophia will be high, invincible and will never, ever, fall again!".
July 28, 2017 Agia Sophia Stadium officially broke ground.

Players

Squad information

NOTE: The players are the ones that have been announced by the AEK Athens' press release. No edits should be made unless a player arrival or exit is announced. Updated 30 June 2018, 23:59 UTC+3.

Transfers

In

Summer

Winter

Out

Summer

Winter

Loan in

Summer

Loan out

Summer

Winter

Notes

 a.  The player paid €250,000 to AEK Athens for the termination of his contract.

Renewals

Overall transfer activity

Spending
Summer:  €2,000,000

Winter:  €330,000

Total:  €2,330,000

Income
Summer:  €0

Winter:  €0

Total:  €0

Expenditure
Summer:  €2,000,000

Winter:  €330,000

Total:  €2,330,000

Pre-season and friendlies

Super League Greece

League table

Results summary

Results by Matchday

Fixtures

Greek Cup

Group C

Matches

Round of 16

Quarter-finals

Semi-finals

Final

UEFA Champions League

Third qualifying round

UEFA Europa League

Play-off round

Group stage

Round of 32

Statistics

Squad statistics

! colspan="13" style="background:#FFDE00; text-align:center" | Goalkeepers
|-

! colspan="13" style="background:#FFDE00; color:black; text-align:center;"| Defenders
|-

! colspan="13" style="background:#FFDE00; color:black; text-align:center;"| Midfielders
|-

! colspan="13" style="background:#FFDE00; color:black; text-align:center;"| Forwards
|-

! colspan="13" style="background:#FFDE00; color:black; text-align:center;"| Left during Summer Transfer Window
|-

! colspan="13" style="background:#FFDE00; color:black; text-align:center;"| Left during Winter Transfer Window
|-

|-
|}

Disciplinary record

|-
! colspan="20" style="background:#FFDE00; text-align:center" | Goalkeepers

|-
! colspan="20" style="background:#FFDE00; color:black; text-align:center;"| Defenders

|-
! colspan="20" style="background:#FFDE00; color:black; text-align:center;"| Midfielders

|-
! colspan="20" style="background:#FFDE00; color:black; text-align:center;"| Forwards

|-
! colspan="20" style="background:#FFDE00; color:black; text-align:center;"| Left during Summer Transfer window

|-
! colspan="20" style="background:#FFDE00; color:black; text-align:center;"| Left during Winter Transfer window

|-
|}

Starting 11

Goalscorers

References

External links
AEK Athens F.C. Official Website

AEK Athens F.C. seasons
AEK Athens
AEK Athens
AEK Athens
Greek football championship-winning seasons